Davide Gabburo (born 1 April 1993) is an Italian cyclist, who currently rides for UCI ProTeam .

Major results

2011
 3rd Trofeo San Rocco
 6th GP Dell'Arno
 10th Overall Tre Ciclistica Bresciana
2014
 1st Stage 4 Grand Prix Cycliste de Gemenc
2015
 2nd Road race, National Under-23 Road Championships
 3rd Trofeo Banca Popolare di Vicenza
 6th Trofeo Città di San Vendemiano
 7th Gran Premio Industrie del Marmo
 10th Giro dell'Appennino
 10th Gran Premio di Poggiana
2017
 9th Overall Tour of Bihor
2018
 6th GP Adria Mobil
2019
 3rd GP Slovenian Istria
 5th Giro della Toscana
 7th Eschborn–Frankfurt
 9th Overall Settimana Internazionale di Coppi e Bartali
2020
 7th Trofeo Laigueglia
2021
 1st Grand Prix Alanya
 5th Grand Prix Velo Alanya
 7th Overall Tour du Limousin
 8th Overall Czech Cycling Tour
2022
 10th Overall Tour of Slovenia

Grand Tour general classification results timeline

References

External links

1993 births
Living people
Italian male cyclists
Cyclists from the Province of Verona